Loče is a small settlement in the City Municipality of Celje in eastern Slovenia. It lies on the northern outskirts of Celje, next to Lake Šmartno. The area is part of the traditional region of Styria. It is now included with the rest of the municipality in the Savinja Statistical Region.

References

External links
Loče on Geopedia

Populated places in the City Municipality of Celje